is a Japanese television drama broadcast by Nippon Television (NTV). It is a remake of the South Korean movie of My Boss, My Hero, It aired in Japan during the summer of 2006.

Synopsis
However, Makio is not very bright, so his father decides to send him back to high school and makes a deal with him: if he can graduate he can become the new leader of the gang. If Makio doesn't graduate, the position of boss will be given to his younger brother, Mikio.

Cast

Episodes

References

External links
 Official website 

Japanese drama television series
2006 Japanese television series debuts
Japanese remakes of South Korean films
2006 Japanese television series endings
Nippon TV dramas
Works about the Yakuza